This is a list of the moths of family Gracillariidae which are found in Chile. It also acts as an index to the species articles and forms part of the full List of moths of Chile. Subfamilies are listed alphabetically.

Subfamily Gracillariinae
Acrocercops serrigera Meyrick, 1915
Chileoptilia yaroella Vargas & Landry, 2005
Parectopa rotigera Meyrick, 1931
Vihualpenia lithraeophaga Mundaca, Parra & Vargas, 2013

Subfamily Phyllocnistinae
Angelabella tecomae Vargas & Parra, 2005
Phyllocnistis puyehuensis Davis, 1994
Prophyllocnistis epidrimys Davis, 1994

External links

Global Taxonomic Database of Gracillariidae (Lepidoptera)

.G
Chile
Moths, Gracillariidae